Schefflera racemosa is a species of plant in the family Araliaceae. It is a canopy tree that is endemic to Western Ghats of India.

References

racemosa
Flora of India (region)